General Vicente Guerrero Dam, also known as Las Adjuntas Dam, is a dam in the Mexican state of Tamaulipas. It was constructed in 1971 for irrigation and public use. It was named for Vicente Guerrero, a revolutionary general of the Mexican War of Independence.

References

Dams in Mexico
1971 establishments in Mexico